Kathryn Tickell, OBE, DL (born 8 June 1967) is an English musician, noted for playing the Northumbrian smallpipes and fiddle.

Music career

Early life
Kathryn Tickell was born in Walsall, then in Staffordshire, to parents who originated from Northumberland and who moved back there with the family when Kathryn was seven. Her paternal grandfather played accordion, fiddle, and organ. Her father, Mike Tickell, sang and her mother played the concertina. Her first instrument was piano when she was six. A year later, she picked up a set of Northumbrian smallpipes brought home by her father, who intended them for someone else. Frustrated by fiddle and piano, she learned that the pipes rewarded her effort. She was inspired by older musicians such as Willy Taylor, Will Atkinson, Joe Hutton, and Billy Pigg.

Performing and recording

At thirteen, she had gained a reputation from performing in festivals and winning pipe contests.  When she was seventeen, she released her first album, On Kielder Side (Saydisc, 1984), which she recorded at her parents' house. During the same year, she was named Official Piper to the Lord Mayor of Newcastle, an office that had been vacant for 13 years, since George Atkinson's appointment for a single year in 1971 . She formed the Kathryn Tickell Band, with Karen Tweed on accordion, bass, and guitar, and released the band's first album in 1991 on Black Crow Records. Later, the band comprised Peter Tickell on fiddle, Julian Sutton on melodeon, and Joss Clapp on guitar. In 2001, the Kathryn Tickell Band was the first band to play traditional folk music at the Promenade Concerts in London.

She recorded with the Penguin Cafe Orchestra when it was led by Simon Jeffes. She met Jeffes while she was in her teens, and he wrote the song "Organum" for her. After Jeffes's death, she played with the Orchestra again over a decade later when it was run by his son, Arthur.

Tickell has also recorded with The Chieftains, The Boys of the Lough, Jimmy Nail, Linda Thompson, Alan Parsons, and Andy Sheppard. She has performed live with Sting, who is also from Newcastle upon Tyne, and has recorded with him on his albums The Soul Cages (1991), Ten Summoner's Tales (1993), Mercury Falling (1996), Brand New Day, (1999), If on a Winter's Night (2009), and The Last Ship (2013).

Two ex-members of the North East England traditional music group the High Level Ranters have appeared on her albums: Tom Gilfellon on On Kielder Side and Alistair Anderson on Borderlands (1986). The latter album included to a tribute to the Wark football team. Several other pipers have appeared on her albums: Troy Donockley on Debatable Lands, Patrick Molard on The Gathering and Martyn Bennett on Borderlands. Debatable Lands included "Our Kate", a composition by Kathryn Tickell dedicated to Catherine Cookson.

In 2011, she took part in the Sunderland A.F.C. charity Foundation of Light event.

She formed Kathryn Tickell and the Side, with Ruth Wall on Celtic harp, Louisa Tuck on cello, and Amy Thatcher on accordion. The group plays a mixture of traditional and classical music. They released an eponymous album in 2014.

In 2018 Tickell established a new band, Kathryn Tickell & The Darkening, with whom she released the album Hollowbone in 2019. This project signals a different approach, with new material. There is a semi-imaginary incursion into the prehistory of Northumbrian music in the track "Nemesis" based on Roman-era texts and a melody by Emperor Hadrian's court musician Mesomedes. There is a foray into a world of ancestral shamanism in "O-u-t Spells Out". The album was greeted with critical acclaim, with four-star reviews in The Observer and the Financial Times, as were the band's various national tours in its first two years of existence.

Other projects
In 1987, the early part of her career was chronicled in The Long Tradition, a TV documentary. Kathryn Tickell's Northumbria, another documentary, appeared in 2006. In 1997, Tickell founded the Young Musicians Fund of the Tyne and Wear Foundation to provide money to young people in northeastern England who wanted to learn music. She founded the Festival of the North East and from 2009 to 2013 was the artistic director of Folkworks.

Awards and honors
 Official Piper for the Lord Mayor of Newcastle upon Tyne, 1984
 Musician of the Year,  BBC Radio 2 Folk Awards, 2004, 2013
 The Queen's Medal for Music, 2009
 Best Traditional Album, Spiral Earth Awards, Northumbrian Voices
 Officer of the Order of the British Empire (OBE) Civil Division, 2015
 Honorary Degree, Open University, 2015
 Deputy Lieutenant (DL) for the County of Northumberland, 2015 
 Honorary Degree (M.Mus), Durham University, 2017
 Honorary Degree (D.Mus), Newcastle University, 2019

Discography
Kathryn Tickell
 On Kielder Side (Saydisc, 1984)
 Borderlands (Black Crow, 1987)
 Common Ground (Black Crow, 1988)
 The Gathering (Park, 1997)
 Debateable Lands (Park, 2000)
 Strange But True (2006)
 Northumbrian Voices (Park, 2012)

Kathryn Tickell & Corrina Hewat
 The Sky Didn't Fall (Park, 2006)

Kathryn Tickell & Ensemble Mystical
 Ensemble Mystical (Park, 2001)

Kathryn Tickell & Friends
 The Northumberland Collection (Park, 1998)
 Water of Tyne (Resilient, 2016)
Kathryn Tickell & Peter Tickell
 What We Do (Resilient, 2008)

Kathryn Tickell & The Darkening
 Hollowbone (Resilient, 2019)

Kathryn Tickell & the Side
 Kathryn Tickell & The Side (Resilient, 2014)

The Kathryn Tickell Band
 The Kathryn Tickell Band (Black Crow, 1991)
 Signs (Black Crow, 1993)
 Air Dancing (Park, 2004)
 Instrumental (Park, 2007)

With Sting

 1991 The Soul Cages
 1993 Ten Summoner's Tales
 1996 Mercury Falling
 1999 Brand New Day
 2009 If on a Winter's Night
 2013 The Last Ship

With others

 1987 Wide Blue Yonder, Oysterband
 1991 The Bells of Dublin, The Chieftains
 1993 Union Café, Penguin Cafe Orchestra
 1993 You Hold the Key, Beth Nielsen Chapman
 1995 The Shouting End of Life, Oysterband
 2000 Stamping Ground, Rod Clements
 2001 "Music for a New Crossing" , Andy Sheppard & Kathryn Tickell
 2002 Fashionably Late, Linda Thompson
 2003 25th Hour, Terence Blanchard
 2003 Echo of Hooves, June Tabor
 2006 Reunion, Daniel Lapp
 2008 Durham Concerto, Jon Lord
 2011 A Matter of Life, Penguin Cafe
 2012 California 37, Train
 2012 Seventeen Summers, Skinny Lister 
 2013 Wintersmith, Steeleye Span
 2016 River Silver, Michel Benita
 2019 Djesse Vol. 2, Jacob Collier

References

External links
 

1967 births
Living people
Players of Northumbrian smallpipes
English fiddlers
Shetland music
Deputy Lieutenants of Northumberland
People educated at Gosforth Academy
Officers of the Order of the British Empire
Musicians from Northumberland
People from Walsall
21st-century violinists
Penguin Cafe Orchestra members